Pilibanga Assembly constituency is one of constituencies of Rajasthan Legislative Assembly in the Ganganagar (Lok Sabha constituency).

Pilibanga Constituency covers all voters from Pilibanga tehsil; parts of Rawatsar tehsil, which include ILRC Rawatsar including Rawatsar Municipal Board, ILRC Khoda, ILRC Gandheli; and part of Hanumangarh tehsil, which includes ILRC Dablirathan.

References

See also 
Member of the Legislative Assembly (India)

Hanumangarh district
Assembly constituencies of Rajasthan